Malekiyeh-ye Gharbi (also Romanized as Māleḵīyeh-ye Gharbī) is a village in Howmeh-ye Gharbi Rural District, in the Central District of Dasht-e Azadegan County, Khuzestan Province, Iran. At the 2006 census, its population was 1,009, in 191 families.

References 

Populated places in Dasht-e Azadegan County